Gravity is a 1980 solo album by English guitarist, composer and improviser Fred Frith from Henry Cow and Art Bears. It was Frith's second solo album and his first since the demise of Henry Cow in 1978. It was originally released in the United States on LP record on The Residents's Ralph record label and was the first of three solo albums Frith made for the label.

Gravity was recorded in Sweden, the United States and Switzerland and featured Frith with Swedish Rock in Opposition group Samla Mammas Manna on one side of the LP, and Frith with United States progressive rock group The Muffins on the other side. Additional musicians included Marc Hollander from Aksak Maboul and Chris Cutler from Henry Cow.

Gravity has been described as an avant-garde "dance" record that draws on rhythm and dance from folk music across the world. AllMusic called it one of the most important experimental guitar titles from Fred Frith.

Background
Fred Frith was a classically-trained violinist who turned to playing blues guitar while at school. In 1967 he went to Cambridge University where he and fellow student, Tim Hodgkinson formed the English avant-rock group Henry Cow. Frith and Hodgkinson remained with the band until its demise in 1978. After the release of Henry Cow's second album in May 1974, Frith recorded his debut solo album, Guitar Solos (1974), which featured unaccompanied and improvised experimental rock music played on prepared guitars by Frith without any overdubbing. Guitar Solos was well received by music critics, and was voted one of the best albums of 1974 by NME.

During the recording of Henry Cow's sixth album in January 1978, musical differences arose within the group over the prevalence of song-oriented material on the album. Some wanted purely instrumental compositions, while others, including Frith, favoured songs. As a compromise Frith and the band's drummer, Chris Cutler released the songs on an album Hopes and Fears (1978) under the name Art Bears, while the instrumental tracks, plus others recorded later were released on Henry Cow's last album, Western Culture (1979). Art Bears went on to make two more albums of songs.

After Henry Cow broke up, Frith moved to New York City in 1979 where he became involved with a number of musical projects, including a new solo album. To make a more "immediate" record after the intensities of Henry Cow and Art Bears, Frith turned his attention to world folk and dance music. In Hopes and Fears he had "rediscovered the joys of song-form", and it was the song "The Dance" that Frith and Cutler wrote for that album that inspired the making of Gravity. Frith said in a BBC interview:

Frith had been listening to music from other cultures, particularly Eastern Europe since the mid-1970s. He made no attempt to notate what he heard, but absorbed it and let it find its way later into his own music. On Gravity Frith mixed up all these different musical styles to make new songs out of them.

Recording
Gravity was the first of a series of projects Frith did for The Residents's record label Ralph Records. He had recorded with The Residents in the late 1970s and early 1980s, and appeared on several of their albums.

Frith used two backing bands for Gravity, Swedish Rock in Opposition group Samla Mammas Manna and United States progressive rock group The Muffins. He recorded side one of the LP record with Samla Mammas Manna at Norrgården Nyvla in Uppsala, Sweden, with additional recording at Sunrise Studios, Kirchberg, Switzerland in August 1979. Side two of the LP was recorded with The Muffins at Catch-a-Buzz Studio in Rockville, Maryland, United States in November 1979, with additional recording at Sunrise Studios in Switzerland in January 1980. Frith recorded two additional tracks with The Muffins, "Vanity, Vanity" and "Dancing in Sunrise, Switzerland", but they were omitted from the album due to space constraints. They appeared later on The Muffins's 1985 album, Open City.

Many of the tracks on Gravity consist of melodic lines woven into complex rhythmic structures taken from different folk music cultures. Frith described in an interview how he arrived in Uppsala with his carefully written music sheets, only to find that Samla Mammas Manna could not read music. But when he played the music to them, he was "stunned by their ability to hear the details, especially the rhythmic details, that I had written."

In 1980 Ralph Records also released a single from the album, "Dancing in the Street" b/w "What a Dilemma".

Title

The title of the album came from a 1937 quote by Curt Sachs (printed on the back of the album sleeve) in which he described dance as "the victory over gravity".

In his 2019 book Henry Cow: The World Is a Problem, Benjamin Piekut called the title "brilliant". He wrote that after Frith's experiences with Henry Cow's restrictive way of conducting themselves, which Piekut called, "clumsy, slow, inefficient, and inconclusive", the title Gravity refers to the "carefree music therein as well as the ponderous concerns of [Frith's former band] reflected in its rearview mirror."

Music
Frith called Gravity a "dance album", not in the disco/funk sense of its day, but a collection of "dance music" drawn from cultures around the world. The album features an array of rock, folk and jazz instruments, plus field recordings, clapping and "whirling", and has been described as a "musical hybridization" of "Latin percussion, calypso festivity, eastern-tinged percussion [and] Klezmer-like celebration".

"The Boy Beats the Rams" opens Gravity with a burst of laughter followed by some tap dancing, "random" percussion and Frith's "distinctive keening" violin. On "Spring Any Day Now" Frith mixes a bossa nova rhythm with a North African melody. "Don't Cry For Me" features Greek mandolin with heavy metal guitar. "Hands of the Juggler" draws on Middle Eastern folk dance, "Slap Dance" is a Serbian "folk romp", and "Career in Real Estate" is in the tradition of a Scottish fiddle tune.

"Dancing in the Street" is a "de/reconstruction" of Martha and the Vandellas's 1964 hit that includes a "bizarrely harmonised guitar" playing the song's melody over a "boiling mass of feedback" and tape manipulation. According to the album's sleeve notes, this track also includes a recording of "Iranian demonstrators celebrating the capture of American hostages".

"Crack in the Concrete" features an e-bowed guitar over "edgy, dissonant chords" and a "massed kazoo choir of horns" that presages Frith's experimental rock band Massacre he formed in New York City in February 1980. "Norrgården Nyvla" flows into "Year of the Monkey" which ends with a brief sample of the 13th Puerto Rico Summertime Band, "ten seconds of the real thing" according to the LP liner notes.

Reception and influence

In the January 1983 edition of DownBeat magazine, Bill Milkowski wrote that in contrast to Art Bears's "bleak attitude", Frith's Gravity is a "truly joyous solo LP, ... an extremely warm, almost whimsical album". Thomas Schulte at AllMusic described it as an "entertaining and multicultural pocket folk festival" and said it was "one of the most important guitar-based, experimental guitar titles from the avant-guitarist". In a BBC Online review of Gravity, Peter Marsh called it "Absolutely essential", adding that it "manages to be wildly eclectic yet avoids incoherence". Brandon Wu of Ground and Sky said that despite his "relative indifference" to the album, one of Gravity great strengths is that it is both accessible and avant-garde. Writing in Sounds, John Gill described Gravity as an album of "wonderfully stateless music", a blend of jazz, rock'n'roll, chamber, European ethnic, and New York City soul and Hispanic. With a reference to Frith's former bands, Henry Cow and Art Bears, Gill added "[a]nd this time, folks, you can dance to it! [italics in the original]"

Gravity  inspired a 2003 album Spring Any Day Now by David Greenberg and David McGuinness with the Concerto Caledonia. Subtitled "Music of 18th century Scotland and elsewhere", the album includes covers of two tracks from Gravity, "Spring Any Day Now" and "Norrgården Nyvla", and a track from Frank Zappa's Roxy & Elsewhere (1974), "Echidna's Arf (Of You)".

Frith continued his exploration of folk and dance music on his next album for Ralph Records, Speechless (1981). As with Gravity, he recorded Speechless with two bands, French Rock in Opposition group Etron Fou Leloublan on one side of the LP, and Frith's New York City group Massacre on the other. The album included extensive tape manipulation, which was an ongoing passion of Frith's at the time.

Live performances
In August 2012 Frith led a performance of Gravity in San Francisco, California entitled "Fred Frith and Friends play Gravity". The performers were Frith, Dominique Leone, Jon Leidecker (Wobbly), Aaron Novik, Ava Mendoza, Jordan Glenn, Kasey Knudsen, Lisa Mezzacappa and Marië Abe. Frith led two more performances of Gravity at Roulette in Brooklyn, New York City on 19 and 20 September 2013, featuring Frith (guitar/electric bass), Leone (keyboards), Leidecker (sampling), Novik (clarinet/bass clarinet), Mendoza (guitar), Abe (accordion), Glenn (drums), Knudsen (alto saxophone), Mezzacappa (bass), Kaethe Hostetter (violin), and William Winant (percussion).

Frith formed the Gravity Band in 2014, comprising Frith (conductor/guitar/bass), Hostetter (violin), Knudsen (saxophone), Novik (clarinet), Abe (accordion), Leidecker (samples), Leone (keyboards), Mendoza (guitar), Mezzacappa (bass), Glenn (drums), Winant (percussion), and Myles Boisen (sound). They performed the album live at the 30th Festival International de Musique Actuelle de Victoriaville in Canada in May 2014, at the Music Meeting in Nijmegen, Netherlands in June 2014, and at the Moers Festival in Germany, also in June 2014.

Track listing
All tracks composed by Fred Frith except where noted.

Original 1980 release

1990 CD re-issue bonus tracks

Personnel

Side one
Fred Frith – guitar, bass guitar, violin, extra percussion
Samla Mammas Manna:
Lars Hollmer – piano, organ, accordion
Hans Bruniusson – drums
Eino Haapala – guitar, mandolin
Marc Hollander – alto saxophone, clarinet

Guests
Olivia Bruynhooghe – tap dancing, clapping
Chris Cutler – snare drum and maracas (track 3), clapping
Tina Curran – whirling, clapping
Catherine Jauniaux – whirling, clapping
Frank Wuyts – recorders (track 6), whirling, clapping
Michel Berckmans – clapping
Etienne Conod – clapping
Denis van Hecke – clapping
Veronique Vincent – clapping

Recording and production
Recorded at Norrgården Nyvla in Uppsala, Sweden and at Sunrise Studios, Kirchberg, Switzerland in August 1979.
Gabriel Rosen – engineer (Sweden)
Etienne Conod – engineer (Switzerland)

Side two
Fred Frith – guitar, bass guitar, violin, keyboards, drums (tracks 1,5,7)
The Muffins:
Dave Newhouse – alto saxophone, organ (track 4)
Thomas Scott – soprano saxophone (track 6)
Paul Sears – drums (tracks 1,2,4,6,8)
Billy Swann – bass guitar (tracks 2,4,6,8)
Marc Hollander – alto saxophone, bass clarinet

Guests
Hans Bruniusson – drums (track 4)
Tina Curran – subliminal bass guitar (track 1)
Frank Wuyts – drums (track 3)

Recording and production
Recorded at Catch-a-Buzz Studio, Rockville, Maryland, United States in November 1979 and at Sunrise Studios, Kirchberg, Switzerland in January 1980.
Thomas Scott and Colleen Scott – engineers (USA)
Etienne Conod – engineer (Switzerland)

Bonus tracks on 1990 CD re-issue
Fred Frith – bass guitar, guitar, violin, keyboards, drums, percussion
Marc Hollander – soprano saxophone (track 18)
Chris Cutler – drums (tracks 15–18)
Frank Wuyts – synthesiser (track 18)
Michel Berckmans – oboe, bassoon (track 18)
Denis van Hecke – cello (track 18)
Lindsay Cooper – bassoon, oboe (tracks 15,16)
Tim Hodgkinson – alto saxophone (track 15)
Annemarie Roelofs – trombone (track 15)
Dagmar Krause – voice (track 17)
Tom Cora – bass guitar, percussion (track 19)

Recording
Track 15 recorded at Sunrise Studios, Kirchberg, Switzerland in July–August 1978, previously unreleased (an outtake from the Henry Cow Western Culture recording sessions) 
Track 16 recorded at Kaleidophon, London in March 1978, originally released on Hopes and Fears (1978) by Art Bears
Track 17 recorded at Sunrise Studios, Kirchberg, Switzerland in January 1978, originally released on Hopes and Fears (1978) by Art Bears
Track 18 recorded at Sunrise Studios, Kirchberg, Switzerland in January 1979, originally released on Un Peu de l'Âme des Bandits (1980) by Aksak Maboul
Track 19 recorded at Sunrise Studios, Kirchberg, Switzerland in January 1984, originally released on Learn to Talk (1984) by Skeleton Crew
Track 20 recorded at Noise, New York City in September 1988, previously unreleased

Artwork
Alfreda Benge – album cover artwork on the original LP record

CD reissues
In 1990 East Side Digital Records and RecRec Music re-issued Gravity on CD with six bonus tracks. In 2002 Fred Records issued a remastered version of the original Gravity with no bonus tracks.

References

Works cited

External links
The Gravity Band with Fred Frith Arte TV stream of Gravity, performed at the Moers Festival, 8 June 2014.

1980 albums
Albums produced by Fred Frith
Fred Frith albums
Fred Records albums
Ralph Records albums
RecRec Music albums
World music albums by English artists